The 2011 Women's South American Volleyball Championship was the 29th edition of the Women's South American Volleyball Championship, organised by South America's governing volleyball body, the Confederación Sudamericana de Voleibol (CSV). It was held in Callao, Peru from September 28 to October 2, 2011.

Competing nations
The following national teams have qualified:

First round

Pool A

|}

|}

Pool B

|}

|}

Final round

Championship

Semifinals

|}

Classification 5–7

|}

Fifth place

|}

Third place

|}

First place

|}

Final standing

Awards

Most Valuable Player

Best Scorer

Best Spiker

Best Blocker

Best Server

Best Digger

Best Setter

Best Receiver

Best Libero

References

External links
CSV official website

Women's South American Volleyball Championships
South American Volleyball Championships
Volleyball
V
September 2011 sports events in South America
October 2011 sports events in South America